William Dorrell (1872 – 1939) was an English professional footballer who played as a winger. His son, Arthur Dorrell, played for Aston Villa, Port Vale, and England.

Career
Dorrell was scouted by Leicester Fosse playing for Singer's, and was transferred in 1892. He replaced Jimmy Atter on the left-wing, and impressed enough to win a £250 transfer move to Aston Villa in May 1894. He scored five goals in 11 First Division appearances for the "Villans", though was allowed to rejoin Leicester Fosse in March 1896. He scored 24 goals in 63 appearances during his second spell at the club, who were now in the Second Division.

Personal life
Dorrell was listed as a licensed victualler in the 1901 census and as a turner in the 1911 census. He had four children with his first wife, Clara, including England international footballer Arthur Dorrell. He remarried to Maria and had another child by 1911. By 1921 he was with his third wife, Alice Frederica, with whom he had another child named William Ray Stephen.

Career statistics
Source:

References

1872 births
1939 deaths
Footballers from Leicester
English footballers
Association football wingers
Singer's F.C. players
Leicester City F.C. players
Aston Villa F.C. players
Belper F.C. players
Port Vale F.C. players
Midland Football League players
English Football League players